A mechanic is an skilled tradesperson who uses tools to build, maintain, or repair machinery, especially cars.

Duties
Most mechanics specialize in a particular field, such as auto body mechanics, air conditioning and refrigeration mechanics, auto mechanics, bicycle mechanics, boiler mechanics, race car mechanics, aircraft mechanics, and other areas.

A mechanic is typically certified by a trade association or regional government power. Mechanics may be separated into two classes based on the type of machines they work on, heavyweight and lightweight. Heavyweight work is on larger machines or heavy equipment, such as tractors and trailers, while lightweight work is on smaller items, such as automotive engines.

Automotive mechanics 

Automotive mechanics have many trades within. Some may specialize in the electrical diagnosis, while others may specialize in the mechanical aspects. Other mechanical areas include: brakes and steering, suspension, automatic or manual transmission, engine repairs, auto body repairs or diagnosing customer complaints.

Automotive mechanics require many years of training to become a licensed automotive mechanic. Countries such as Canada have a governmental certification body that tests and maintains automotive mechanics qualifications. The United States of America uses an organization that is called ASE. This organization provides independent testing of a automotive mechanics skills with over 57 different tests that can be taken.

References